A terrestrial reference frame (TRF) is the reference frame as one views from Earth, or from the surface of another Earth-like planet.  A TRF affects the way humans perceive almost everything from day to day because as they live on the Earth an Earth-based point of view was the only viewpoint from which the rest of the universe could be observed, at least until the space age.  One of the most noticeable results of the TRF is how the Sun appears to rise and set in the sky every day, which is actually an effect of the Earth rotating on its axis.

Example Effects
The flight paths of aircraft.
The retrograde motions of the planets, e.g. Mars (which is the easiest to see).
The apparent rising and setting of the Sun, Moon, planets, and stars.

See also
Apparent retrograde motion
Coriolis effect
International Terrestrial Reference System
Celestial sphere
Overview effect

References

 
 Babcock, Alice K.; Wilkins, George A. (1988) The Earth's Rotation and Reference Frames for Geodesy and Geodynamics Springer 

Frames of reference
Geodesy